CFIS may refer to:

Education 

 Calgary French and International School
 Centro de Formación Interdisciplinaria Superior

Disambiguation pages